Abdullah Abdurahman (18 December 1872 – 2 February 1940) was a South African politician and physician, born in Wellington, South Africa. He was the first Coloured city councillor of Cape Town, and the first ever Coloured South African to win election to a public body. He led the anti-segregationist movement African Political Organization established in 1902.

Early life
Abdurahman was the son of Muslim Indians whose parents were greengrocers. His grandparents were slaves, possibly from India, who had bought their freedom. After receiving a good education in Wellington and Cape Town where he attended the South African College Schools, he went to the University of Glasgow to study medicine in 1888, qualifying as a doctor in 1893. It was in Glasgow that he met his first wife, Nellie Potter James. Upon returning to South Africa he set up a thriving private practice in Cape Town.

Local government career
In 1904 he was elected Cape Town's first Coloured city councillor, a position he held almost uninterrupted until his death. As city councillor he worked to improve the conditions of the Cape Coloured community, especially within the field of education; he helped set up the first secondary schools for Coloured people in Cape Town. From 1923 to 1937 he chaired many of the council's Committees, including the Streets and Drainage Committee, which gave him an increasingly strong influence on local government. Aburahman was also the first Coloured person to be elected to the Cape Provincial Council in 1914, a position he held until his death.

African Political Organisation
The greatest political achievements, however, of Abdurahman's political life, were connected to his involvement with the African Political Organisation. Elected president in 1905, his contribution to the party's success was so great that the party was often jokingly referred to as Abdurahman's Political Organisation. The party's goal was to fight the increasing racial oppression in the country, initially mainly on behalf of the Coloured (or mixed race) people who made up the majority of the doctor's constituents in District Six. Abdurahman led a delegations to London to secure franchise rights for the Coloured population in 1906. In 1909, before the creation of the Union of South Africa in 1910, Dr Abdurahman participated in a second delegation to London to try to have the Cape Qualified Franchise extended to all black South Africans. This delegation was led by William Schreiner and included members of the black community who would form the African National Congress in 1912. It too was unsuccessful. 
Upon his return to South Africa the doctor reached out to African and Indian political movements in an attempt to resist the rising tide of 
racism.

In 1925 Dr Abdurahman was asked to lead a delegation to the Viceroy of India by the South African Indian Congress. He met Lord Reading who was deeply impressed. The viceroy wrote to London: ‘Dr Rahaman [sic] put forward powerful and well-argued statements of disabilities of humiliating description in social, political and economic life which have been imposed on Indians by legislation in Union (of South Africa) and of apprehension not without ground that contemplated Asiatic legislation will render positions of Indians wholly impossible….Much stress was laid by Dr Rahaman on favourable treatment of white element in population composed in many cases of races not born in or loyal to British Empire at expense of Indians born in and loyal to British connection…I found the position very difficult. I am deeply impressed by the humiliations to which Indians in South Africa are subjected, and by the gravity of the implications of the projected legislation which will be hurried through the second reading stage in the new year.’
During the visit Dr Abdurahman also addressed the Indian National Congress in Kanpur in December 1925, making a considerable impression with his impassioned speech. ‘Wherever Dr Rehman and his colleagues have been and by this time they have practically covered the length and breadth of the country they have met with unanimous warmth and welcome from the people of India’, wrote the Sunday Times on 31 January 1926.

In the end, however, the racist legislation introduced by J.B.M. Hertzog defeated attempts to preserve the South Africa's conservative but liberal order. African men in the Cape lost the vote in 1936. The Doctor's campaigns - like the campaigns of the African National Congress the South African Communist Party and the Non-European Unity Movement in this period - bore little fruit. By the late 1930s, other political parties, such as the more radical National Liberation League, had taken the initiative.

Death and legacy
On 2 February 1940, Abdurahman died of a cardiac arrest. His funeral was attended by over 30,000 people. After his death, the party he had built up went into rapid decline. His political legacy is a mixed one; modern, more radical commentators see him as overly accommodating to the white authorities, and as far as practical results are concerned, the achievements of his political career were limited. On the other hand, there is little doubt that he was the most powerful South African Coloured politician of his time, and his popularity in the non-European community was immense, as was the respect he enjoyed with the white elite. In 1999, Nelson Mandela posthumously awarded Dr. Abdurahman the Order for Meritorious Service: Class 1 (Gold) for his work against racial oppression.

Abdurahman was married twice: once to the British Helen (Nellie) Potter James, whom he met in Glasgow. They had two daughters, Waradea "Rosie" and Zainunnisa (Cissie) Gool, and divorced in 1923.  His younger daughter from this marriage, Cissie (1900–1963), became an important political figure in her own right, as a municipal councillor in Cape Town. His second marriage was in 1925 to Margaret May Stansfield. She bore him one daughter Begum (who married the physician Ralph Hendrickse), and two sons, Abdul and Nizam.

Notes

Further reading
Dr. Abdullah Abdurahman (South African History Online)
The birth of the African Political Organisation (South African History Online)

1872 births
1940 deaths
People from Wellington, Western Cape
South African people of Malay descent
South African politicians of Indian descent
20th-century South African physicians
African Political Organization politicians
Alumni of the University of Glasgow
Alumni of South African College Schools